This is a list of possibly nonassociative algebras. An algebra is a module, wherein you can also multiply two module elements. (The multiplication in the module is compatible with multiplication-by-scalars from the base ring).

 Akivis algebra
 Algebra for a monad
 Albert algebra
 Alternative algebra
 Azumaya algebra
 Banach algebra
 Birman–Wenzl algebra
 Boolean algebra
 Borcherds algebra
 Brauer algebra
 C*-algebra
 Central simple algebra
 Clifford algebra
 Cluster algebra
 Dendriform algebra
 Differential graded algebra
 Differential graded Lie algebra
 Exterior algebra
 F-algebra
 Filtered algebra
 Flexible algebra
 Freudenthal algebra
 Genetic algebra
 Geometric algebra
 Gerstenhaber algebra
 Graded algebra
 Griess algebra
 Group algebra
 Group algebra of a locally compact group
 Hall algebra
 Hecke algebra of a locally compact group
 Heyting algebra
 Hopf algebra
 Hurwitz algebra
 Hypercomplex algebra
 Incidence algebra
 Iwahori–Hecke algebra
 Jordan algebra
 Kac–Moody algebra
 Kleene algebra
 Leibniz algebra
 Lie algebra
 Lie superalgebra
 Malcev algebra
 Non-associative algebra
 Octonion algebra
 Pre-Lie algebra
 Poisson algebra
 Process algebra
 Quadratic algebra
 Quaternion algebra
 Rees algebra
 Relation algebra
 Relational algebra
 Schur algebra
 Semisimple algebra
 Separable algebra
 Shuffle algebra
 Sigma-algebra
 Simple algebra
 Structurable algebra
 Supercommutative algebra
 Symmetric algebra
 Tensor algebra
 Universal enveloping algebra
 Vertex operator algebra
 von Neumann algebra
 Zinbiel algebra

This is a list of fields of algebra.

 Linear algebra
 Homological algebra
 Universal algebra

 
Algebras